Fiddlewood is a common name for several plants and may refer to:

 Citharexylum, native to the Americas
 Vitex gaumeri, native to Central America